Leonard James Russell (born November 17, 1969) is a former professional American football player who was selected by the New England Patriots in the 1st round (14th overall) of the 1991 NFL Draft. A 6'2", 235-lb. running back from Arizona State University, Russell played in 6 NFL seasons from 1991 to 1996 for the Patriots, the Denver Broncos, the St. Louis Rams, and the San Diego Chargers.

Professional career
In 1991, Russell was selected as the AP Offensive Rookie of the Year after rushing for 959 yards and 4 touchdowns for the Patriots.

In 1993, Bill Parcells Bill Parcells took over as head coach, bringing a strong focus on running the football.  Russell rushed for 1,088 yards and 7 TDs.

Before the start of the 1994 season, following his best year with New England, he was released after the Patriots traded for Marion Butts, the leading rusher from the Chargers.

Though not always utilized heavily in the passing game, Russell was an effective receiver for a power running back, catching 71.2% of targets during his career.

NFL career statistics

Post Football
Leonard is currently the Resident Manager of the Salvation Army Adult Rehabilitation Center in Perris, CA.

Personal life
Former Indianapolis Colts defensive back Chuckie Miller is his cousin.

References

1969 births
Living people
American football running backs
Arizona State Sun Devils football players
Denver Broncos players
New England Patriots players
San Diego Chargers players
St. Louis Rams players
National Football League Offensive Rookie of the Year Award winners
Players of American football from Long Beach, California
Long Beach Polytechnic High School alumni